This is a list of Iranian football transfers for the 2021 summer transfer window. Only moves from Persian Gulf Pro League are listed.
The summer transfer window will begin on 16 August 2021 and closes at midnight on 7 November 2021.
Players without a club may join at any time. This list includes transfers featuring at least one Iran Football League club which were completed after the end of the winter 2020–21 transfer window on 16 March and before the end of the 2021 summer window.

Rules and regulations 
According to Iran Football Federation rules for 2021–22 Persian Gulf Pro League, each Football Club is allowed to take up to maximum 7 new Iranian player from the other clubs who already played in the 2020–21 Persian Gulf Pro League season. In addition to these seven new players, each club is allowed to take up to 3 players from Free agent (who did not play in 2021–22 Persian Gulf Pro League season or doesn't list in any 2021–22 League after season's start) during the season. Under-25 years old players must be under contract of the club in the previous season. Under-21 and under-19 years old players can also be signed during the season.

Players limits
The Iranian Football Clubs who participate in 21–22 Iranian football different levels are allowed to have up to maximum 63 players in their player lists, which will be categorized in the following groups:
 Up to maximum 20 adult (without any age limit) players
 Up to maximum 4 under-25 players (i.e. the player whose birth is after 1 January 1997).
 Up to maximum 9 under-23 players (i.e. the player whose birth is after 1 January 1999).
 Up to maximum 15 under-21 players (i.e. the player whose birth is after 1 January 2001).
 Up to maximum 15 under-19 players (i.e. the player whose birth is after 1 January 2003).

Persian Gulf Pro League

Aluminium

In:

Out:

Esteghlal

In:

Out:

Fajr Sepasi

In:

Out:

Foolad

In:

Out:

Gol Gohar

In:

Out:

Havadar

In:

Out:

Mes Rafsanjan

In:

Out:

Naft Masjed-Soleyman

In:

Out:

Nassaji

In:

Out:

Padideh

In:

Out:

Paykan

In:

Out:

Persepolis

In:

Out:

Sanat Naft

In:

Out:

Sepahan

In:

 
 

 

Out:

Tractor

In:

Out:

Zob Ahan

In:

Out:

Notes and references

Football transfers summer 2021
2021-22
Transfers